Ewa Da Cruz (born Ewa Benedicte Övre Skulstad; July 9, 1977) also known as Ewa Skulstad or Ewa Benedicte Övre Skulstad, is a Norwegian-American television, soap opera and film actress.<ref
name="tv.combio"></ref> Da Cruz is best known for her portrayal of the high-roller heiress Vienna Hyatt on As the World Turns, CBS.

Biography
Da Cruz was born in Tromsø and raised in Bergen, Norway. She began her modeling career in her native Norway, at eight years of age, for a major clothing line. She continued to model for print ads, editorials and runways in Oslo. Her career in Norway includes  commercial work, along with short films, documentaries and theatre work before moving to the United States.

Acting
She came to the United States to attend the American Academy of Dramatic Arts in New York and graduated in 2004. She was then selected to become a member of the American Academy of Dramatic Arts Theatre Company for 2004-2005.

She has also appeared in the video "Su Veneno" ("Her Poison") by Aventura.

Since moving to New York, she has appeared in such films as Bella, Kettle of Fish, Sex & Sushi, Dice, Charlie, Abingdon, I Think I Thought, and Dogs Lie.

She played Vienna Hyatt on CBS's As the World Turns from 2006 to 2010.

She has also appeared in supporting roles, on such TV shows as Lipstick Jungle, Law & Order: Criminal Intent and Damages.

Awards
Da Cruz was named one of Soap's most beautiful women in Soap Opera Digest in 2007.

She was also voted ATWT's hottest "newcomer" in Soap Opera Digest in 2007.

At Soap Central she was nominated and won the 2007 Dankies as an Outstanding Special Guest or Recurring Role.

She was also nominated at the 2007-2008 Dankies for a host of awards, including; Outstanding Supporting Actress, Outstanding Newcomer, Favourite Onscreen Couple or Duo, Outstanding Overall Performer and Most Attractive Female Star, (for which she won).

Modeling
Her modelling career includes numerous print ads, editorials, runways, covers and commercials both in Europe and USA.

Da Cruz posed nude in the Norwegian edition of Playboy magazine and was the Playmate of the month for May 1999.<ref
name="www.seher.no"></ref>

She has also appeared in Magazines such as Film Tidskrift, Shape-Up, KK, Det Nye, Mascara, Rouge, Watch! Magazine, Capitol File and French Vogue.

Da Cruz has also been the cover model for several romance novels, including Elizabeth Hoyt’s ‘’Scandalous Desires’’.

Writing
She is a freelance journalist with monthly columns in the Norwegian editions of magazines such as Rouge, Cosmopolitan and Mascara.

References

External links

1977 births
People from Tromsø
Actors from Bergen
Living people
Norwegian film actresses
Norwegian soap opera actresses
Norwegian television actresses
American film actresses
American soap opera actresses
American television actresses
Female models from New York (state)
Norwegian emigrants to the United States
American Academy of Dramatic Arts alumni
21st-century Norwegian actresses
21st-century American women